Sonja Hausladen (born 5 July 1963) is an Austrian butterfly and individual medley swimmer. She competed at the 1980 Summer Olympics and the 1984 Summer Olympics.

References

External links
 

1963 births
Living people
Austrian female butterfly swimmers
Austrian female medley swimmers
Olympic swimmers of Austria
Swimmers at the 1980 Summer Olympics
Swimmers at the 1984 Summer Olympics
Swimmers from Vienna